Le Pouce (English: "The Thumb") is the third highest mountain in Mauritius, at 812 meters (2664 feet). Only Piton de la Petite Rivière Noire (828 m) and Pieter Both (820 m) are taller. It is named Le Pouce because of the thumb-shaped peak of the mountain. It can be viewed from the capital of Mauritius, Port Louis, and is a popular hike for the view of the city. The mountain is in the Moka Range and is closest to the village of La Laura-Malenga in the Moka District. Charles Darwin ascended the mountain on 2 May 1836.

Natural features
The Mascarene Islands, the island chain that Mauritius lies in, is a volcanic belt. Le Pouce is the second highest peak in the Moka Range, which was formed ten million years ago from volcano eruptions. The range is a basalt lava dome and is no longer volcanically active.

Le Pouce is overgrown with guava and acacia, which are not native to the area. One example of flora endemic to Le Pouce is Pandanus pseudomontanus commonly known as Le Pouce Mountain Screwpine. This plant is not officially listed on the IUCN Red List, but IUCN has potentially assessed it as critically endangered. The only individuals of this species are two plants in the Le Pouce Mountain Nature Reserve. Since both of these are male plants, the species is at "extremely high risk of extinction'.

Hiking
The trek to the top of Le Pouce is considered an easy hike. However, the ascent is very steep, especially near the thumb. Le Pouce can be reached from Moka or Port Louis. Unlike Pieter Both, climbing gear is not needed. From the peak, Port Louis, Moka, and Beau-Bassin Rose-Hill can be seen, as well as many other places around the island.

History
Le Pouce was formed ten million years ago in a basalt lava dome. Charles Darwin ascended the mountain during his voyage around the world. He recorded in his journal:

As time went by and tourism increased, hiking Le Pouce became a tourist attraction.

Le Pouce Nature Reserve
Le Pouce Nature Reserve was created in 1951. It protects an area of 0.69 km2 on the mountain's northwest flank.

Gallery

References and notes

Mountains of Mauritius
Protected areas of Mauritius